The violaceous quail-dove (Geotrygon violacea) is a species of bird in the family Columbidae. It is found in Argentina, Bolivia, Brazil, Colombia, Costa Rica, Guyana, Nicaragua, Panama, Paraguay, Peru, Suriname, and Venezuela.

Taxonomy and systematics

The violaceous quail-dove and most of what are now the other species in genus Geotrygon were previously in genus Oreopeleia. It has two subspecies, the nominate G. v. violacea and G. v. albiventer.

Description

They weigh . Adult males of the nominate subspecies have a grayish mauve crown, a grayish white face, and an iridescent purple to amethyst hindneck and shoulders. The rest of the upperparts are brown with an iridescent purple wash. The throat and breast are white with a purple tinge, the belly white, and the flanks buff. The eye is yellow-brown to orange-brown. Adult females are duller, with the purple gloss confined to the hindneck and shoulders. Their face and throat is pale gray, the neck and breast brownish with a purple tint, and the eye brown. Juveniles are similar to the female but darker, with no iridescence, and reddish to cinnamon scalloping on the upperparts. G. v. albiventer is bluer than the nominate on the head, breast, and shoulders.

Distribution and habitat

The nominate subspecies of violaceous quail-dove has a discontinuous distribution. It is found in southeastern Colombia; Guyana and Suriname; northeastern Brazil; parts of Peru and Bolivia; and southeastern Brazil, eastern Paraguay, and far northeastern Argentina. G. v. albiventer is found in Nicaragua, Costa Rica, Panama, and through northeastern Colombia to eastern Venezuela. Some seasonal movements are suspected but not documented. It inhabits the undergrowth and understory of tropical evergreen forest, both primary and secondary, and cacao plantations as well.

Behavior

Feeding

The violaceous quail-dove forages on the ground for seeds, fallen fruits, and probably small invertebrates.

Breeding

The violaceous quail-dove's breeding season appears to span from March possibly to November, based on the timing of observations of adults in breeding condition, a nest with two eggs, and juveniles.

Vocalization

The violaceous quail-dove's advertising call is "a repeated, single, rather high-pitched cooing note".

Status

The IUCN has assessed the violaceous quail-dove as being of Least Concern. Though it appears to be rare to uncommon in much of its range, it has a large overall population.

References

violaceous quail-dove
Birds of Nicaragua
Birds of Costa Rica
Birds of Panama
Birds of Colombia
Birds of Venezuela
Birds of Bolivia
Birds of the Atlantic Forest
violaceous quail-dove
Taxonomy articles created by Polbot